The operational rolling stock of Companhia Paulista de Trens Metropolitanos (CPTM) is composed by 188 different compositions of 14 different series, produced between 1956 and 2017, and it is the biggest fleet of Brazil. The Company are passing by a deep fleet modernization since 2007, which aims to withdraw the whole old trains. The modernization is being done also in the lines.

Although, the biggest part of the modernization works is suffering delays since the initial prediction of completion was exceeded in 2012 and, because of that, the Company has been withdrawing the old fleets (trains prior to 1998) gradually.

The fleets are identified by serial numbers and they are with your visual communication being updated to the new red pattern in so far as they undergo into general review, which occurs after a certain mileage. Older trains already passed by several visual modifications, internal and external, besides small, medium and large reforms.

All CPTM trains have a  broad track gauge and overhead catenary electric transmission of 3 kV DC. All lines operates with ATC system, however, Lines 7, 9 and 12 are being modernized to ATO, and Lines 8, 10 e 11 to CBTC. All operating compositions will have the two new systems when the new signalling starts to work.

Current fleet 
 Series with links have an information page about them in Portuguese.
 All new EMUs undergo tests in all lines, but the Company keeps on exclusive tracks for various tests at Presidente Altino's courtyard and in the Line 7.

Extinct fleet

References

External links 

 Official page of CPTM

Railway companies of Brazil
Companhia Paulista de Trens Metropolitanos